Armando Loaiza Mariaca (8 December 1943 – 18 January 2016) served as the Foreign Minister of Bolivia from 14 June 2005 to 23 January 2006 when a new administration took office.

He was born in La Paz, and died aged 72.

See also
List of foreign ministers in 2005
List of foreign ministers in 2006

References

External links

 

1943 births
2016 deaths
People from La Paz
Foreign ministers of Bolivia
Bolivian diplomats